Mark Mueller (born July 11, 1957) is an American songwriter. A two-time winner of the ASCAP Pop Award for writing one of the Most Performed Songs of the year, he has had three Billboard Hot 100 Top Ten singles and one #1 Adult Contemporary hit. He co-wrote #1 hits "Crush" by Jennifer Paige and "That's What Love Is For" by Amy Grant and wrote both words and music for the Top 10 hit "Nothin' At All" by Heart. Songs he has written have been featured on RIAA-certified gold and platinum records in four consecutive decades:  the 1980s, 1990s, 2000s and 2010s; and on the Billboard Top 10 charts for 30 years.

For his work in television, Mueller is the recipient of two Emmy nominations, both in the category of Outstanding Achievement in Music and Lyrics. Mueller wrote the words and music for the theme songs of both the original Disney's DuckTales and Chip 'n Dale Rescue Rangers animated TV series as well as the 2017 DuckTales reboot. In 2022, Mueller's Chip 'n Dale: Rescue Rangers theme song was performed by rapper and singer Post Malone for the Disney+ movie version of Chip 'n Dale: Rescue Rangers and also appears on the soundtrack.

A Vanity Fair magazine article about Mueller and his DuckTales theme song covered his pop music career and his experience writing the song. Mueller was born in the Bay Area and graduated from University of California, Berkeley; he lives and works in Los Angeles.

Chart history

"Crush", recorded by Jennifer Paige, was #3 on the Billboard Hot 100 Chart for 4 weeks. It spent 17 weeks in the Top 10 and 25 weeks overall on the chart. "Crush" also reached the #2 position on the R&R CHR airplay chart.

"Crush" was a #1 single in Canada, Spain, New Zealand and Australia. In the UK, "Crush" reached #1 on the airplay chart and #4 on the BPI singles chart, where it spent 3 weeks in the Top 10.

In 2016, "Crush" returned to the Billboard Top 10 when it peaked at #5 on the magazine's Smooth Jazz Airplay chart in a cover by jazz keyboardist John Novello. His version features R&B saxophone artist Gerald Albright on the chorus. It spent a total of 19 weeks in the Top 30.

"That's What Love Is For" by Amy Grant was #1 on the Billboard Adult Contemporary chart for 3 weeks (13 weeks in the Top 10 and 32 weeks on the chart overall), reached #7 on the Billboard Hot 100 chart (4 weeks in the Top 10) and peaked at #4 on the R&R CHR chart.

"Nothin' at All" by Heart reached #10 on the Billboard Hot 100 and spent 16 weeks on the chart overall. It was #6 on the Billboard Mainstream Rock Songs for two weeks and stayed in the Top 10 for 4 weeks. Mueller wrote both words and music for the Pop/Rock song.

Mueller's Eternal single "I Am Blessed" made the UK Top Ten on the BPI singles chart, peaking at #7 during its 3 weeks in the Top 10.

"Someone" performed by El DeBarge made the Top 20 Billboard Adult Contemporary chart and peaked at #20, where it spent two weeks. Overall it stayed on the magazine's Adult Contemporary Chart for 13 weeks as well as 9 weeks on the Billboard Hot 100. It was co-written with 2-time Grammy-winner Jay Graydon and singer Robbie Nevil.

Earth, Wind & Fire recorded "You & I", a single Mueller co-wrote with singer Robbie Nevil that was a Billboard R&B Chart Top 30 hit in 1987, reaching #29.

ABBA's Agnetha Faltskog recorded Mueller's "I Wasn't the One (Who Said Goodbye)", which was a Top 20 hit in 1988, reaching #19 on the Billboard Adult Contemporary Chart. It was a duet with Peter Cetera, former lead singer of the band Chicago. Co-written with Aaron Zigman, the song also spent time in the Billboard Hot 100, peaking at #93.

George Benson's "No One Emotion", which Mueller co-wrote with Clif Magness, was released as a single in the UK in 1985 where it reached #76 on the Official British Pop Chart.

"Just Because I Love You" by Lina Santiago reached #27 on the Billboard Rhythmic Top 40 Chart hit in 1996. It spent 8 weeks in the Billboard Hot 100, peaking at #78.

Mueller's first Billboard chart hit was "I Don't Want To Be Lonely'", performed by Dana Valery. It reached #23 on the Billboard Adult Contemporary chart and spent 13 weeks on that chart and 5 weeks on the magazine's Hot 100.

Gold and Platinum Records

Mueller's work in the U.S. has been featured on RIAA-certified platinum and gold records by artists including: Heart, Amy Grant, 'N Sync featuring Justin Timberlake, Lea Michele (on the Glee: The Music, Volume 2 Soundtrack), Jennifer Paige, Earth, Wind & Fire, SWV, Al Jarreau, George Benson, Aaron Carter, El DeBarge, Agnetha Fältskog of ABBA, Peter Cetera, The Pointer Sisters (on the Billboard #1 We Are the World (album)). His theme song for DuckTales is featured on the platinum-selling record The Music of Disney: A Legacy in Song.

Internationally, Mueller's songs have been on the UK's BPI-certified platinum and gold records by artists including: Girls Aloud featuring Cheryl Cole, Eternal, Steps and Australia's ARIA-certified gold records including: Jennifer Paige, Lea Michele (Glee: The Music, Volume 2) and lead singer of Little River Band John Farnham's solo album Age of Reason, which went 11 x platinum.

Television and Film

Mueller received his two Emmy nominations for his work as a lyricist on the ABC-TV series Life Goes On and the NBC-TV series Quincy, M.E.. He wrote both words and music for the title song of Disney's animated series DuckTales (performed by Jeff Pescetto) and Chip 'n Dale Rescue Rangers (performed by Pescetto on the series and The Jets on the Disney Afternoon album). He also wrote the theme song for 1991 film The Little Engine That Could.

Mueller co-wrote the title song, the lyrics and the script for an all-sung CBS-TV musical pilot he executive produced titled Shangri-La Plaza. The show starred Terrence Mann, Chris Sarandon, Melora Hardin and Savion Glover.

The DuckTales theme was performed live twice on the Tonight Show Starring Jimmy Fallon in 2018. In March 2018, it was sung by Brendan Urie of Panic! at the Disco after being selected from the "Audience Suggestion Box." In September 2018 Carrie Underwood sang a brief, spontaneous duet of the DuckTales theme with Jimmy Fallon after telling him it was one of her young son's favorite songs.

The DuckTales theme was played live on ABC-TV's Dancing with the Stars in September 2016 on the second episode of the show's 23rd season, with a performance by the show's Season 20 champion Val Chmerkovskiy and Olympic Gold Medalist Laurie Hernandez.

"Crush" was featured on the "Ballad" episode of Glee in 2009, when it was covered by Lea Michele. Her version of the song is also featured on the soundtrack album Glee: The Music, Volume 2, which peaked at #1 on the Billboard Soundtrack Chart, #3 on the Billboard Hot 200 Album Chart in December 2009 and was certified as a gold record by the RIAA in January 2010. "Crush" was also prominently used in a special TV-movie-length episode of ABC-TV's Sabrina, the Teenage Witch set in Rome.

Mueller wrote the song "Babysitting Blues", performed by actress Elisabeth Shue, Blues legend Albert Collins and the cast of Adventures in Babysitting in Chicago-area nightclub Fitzgerald's. The scene was shot over the course of three days and takes place during a pivotal chase sequence.

For the NBC-TV musical comedy series Rags to Riches, Mueller wrote new comedic lyrics for existing hit songs from the '50s and '60s that were featured in most episodes of both seasons of the show. He also wrote the lyrics to the show's theme song.

With Lalo Schifrin, Mueller co-wrote all songs featured in the original film musical Berlin Blues, starring Julia Migenes.

Mueller's songs have been featured in films including: One Hour Photo, Pokémon: The First Movie, Money Talks, B*A*P*S, National Lampoon's Vegas Vacation, The Last Starfighter, Adventures in Babysitting, Simply Irresistible, The Legend of Billie Jean and Honey, I Blew Up The Kid.

Stage

Mueller wrote the lyrics and co-wrote the book of an original musical titled Butterfly, which was directed by Jack Hofsiss and performed at the Goodspeed Opera House. Bernadette Peters performed the song "The Next Dream" from the musical on the Carol Burnett TV variety show Carol & Company.

Mueller also created an original musical, How The Hell Did I Get Here?, with Downton Abbey star and SAG Award-winning actress Lesley Nicol. Mueller, who accompanies Nicol on piano onstage, first performed the show in 2017 at Nicol's alma mater, London's Guildhall School of Music and Drama and in Hong Kong at the historic Fringe Club.

How The Hell Did I Get Here? opened in Chicago in March, 2022 and made its New York City Off-Broadway debut in April, 2022. The show received an Off Broadway Alliance Award nomination in the category of best Solo Performance in May. The show was scheduled to be a part of the Pittsburgh Public Theater 2022 season at the O'Reilly Theater but was initially postponed due to Covid and later to a death in Nicol's family.   The autobiographical musical is directed by Luke Kernaghan and produced by Pemberley Productions.

Awards

Primetime Emmy Awards
{| class="wikitable sortable"
|-
! Year
! Category
! Show
! Song
! Result
|-
| 1983
| Primetime Emmy Award for Outstanding Original Music and Lyrics
| Quincy, M.E.
|"Quincy's Wedding Song"
| 
|-
| 1991
| Primetime Emmy Award for Outstanding Original Music and Lyrics
| Life Goes On
|"Bittersweet Waltz"
| 
|-

ASCAP Pop Awards

!Ref.
|-
| 1991
| "That's What Love Is For" by Amy Grant
| rowspan=4|Most Performed Songs
| 
| 

|-
|| 1998
| "Crush" by Jennifer Paige
| 
| 
|-

BMI Pop Awards

!Ref.
|-
| 1986
| "Nothin' at All" by Heart
| rowspan=4|Most Performed Songs
| 
| 
|-

References

External links

Living people
American lyricists
Place of birth missing (living people)
Songwriters from California
1957 births
American male songwriters
20th-century American composers
20th-century American male musicians
21st-century American composers
21st-century American male musicians